Waldo is a town in Columbia County, Arkansas, United States. The population was 1,372 at the 2010 census.

History

Waldo celebrated its 120th year as a city in 2007. The small community was once a booming rail city on the Cotton Belt train route. The city has a rail museum with various displays showing its rail history.

The city began to wane in population in the 1950s when neighboring Magnolia began drawing industry.

Waldo was once home to the Waldo High School Bulldogs basketball teams. Consistently these teams made playoffs and on numerous occasions won the state championship. The legacy of Waldo School will carry on in the community despite its closing in 2005.

The Waldo Water Tower, completed in 1936 by the Pittsburgh-Des Moines Steel Co., is listed on the National Register of Historic Places.

Geography
Waldo is located in northwestern Columbia County.

Waldo, located in South Arkansas near the northern Louisiana border, has a subtropical climate like that of the Bayou State and similar terrain. The area is characterized by lowlands and swamps. Most of the area in and about the city is covered with pine or hardwood forests.

Demographics

2020 census

As of the 2020 United States census, there were 1,151 people, 558 households, and 329 families residing in the city.

2000 census
As of the census of 2000, there were 1,594 people, 645 households, and 425 families residing in the city. The racial makeup of the city was 39.77% White, 58.72% Black or African American, 0.38% Native American, 0.63% from other races, and 0.50% from two or more races.  1.57% of the population were Hispanic or Latino of any race.

There were 645 households, of which 29.8% had children under the age of 18 living with them, 35.3% were married couples living together, 26.0% had a female householder with no husband present, and 34.0% were non-families. 29.3% of all households were made up of individuals, and 14.3% had someone living alone who was 65 years of age or older.  The average household size was 2.47 and the average family size was 3.05.

In the city, the population was spread out, with 27.8% under the age of 18, 11.5% from 18 to 24, 24.0% from 25 to 44, 21.9% from 45 to 64, and 14.8% who were 65 years of age or older.  The median age was 34 years. For every 100 females, there were 81.1 males.  For every 100 females age 18 and over, there were 74.7 males.

The median income for a household in the city was $20,353, and the median income for a family was $24,306. Males had a median income of $25,300 versus $17,212 for females. The per capita income for the city was $11,170.  About 30.6% of families and 34.2% of the population were below the poverty line, including 49.2% of those under age 18 and 21.5% of those age 65 or over.

Education
The Magnolia School District, including Magnolia High School, serves the community. The Waldo School District consolidated into the Magnolia district on July 1, 2006. The Waldo district operated Waldo Elementary School (K-6) and Waldo High School (7-12).

Infrastructure

Highways
  U.S. Highway 371
  Arkansas Highway 98

Notable people
 Mujahid Abdul-Karim, imam of Masjid Al Rasul mosque in Watts, Los Angeles, and leader of the Imam Mahdi Movement
 Algie D. Brown, member of the Louisiana House of Representatives
 Chris DeFrance, professional football player
 Travis Jackson, baseball shortstop; inducted into the National Baseball Hall of Fame
 Sytia Messer, college basketball coach
 Travis E. Watkins, recipient of the Medal of Honor for his actions in the Korean War

See also

 List of towns in Arkansas

References

Further reading

 The History of Waldo

Cities in Columbia County, Arkansas
Cities in Arkansas
Populated places established in 1887
1887 establishments in Arkansas